William Wroth (1576–1641), a minister of the Church of England, is generally credited with the establishment of the first Independent Church in Wales in 1639. From 1617 until 1639 Wroth was Rector of the parish church at Llanvaches in Monmouthshire where his Congregationalist chapel was founded.

Life
 Wroth was raised in Abergavenny, and educated at the University of Oxford. He spent fifteen years at Oxford, where he graduated BA from Christ Church in 1596 and MA in 1605 from Jesus College. There is a tradition that he came to Oxford as the servant of the prominent Sir Edward Lewis of Van, Caerphilly, who graduated similarly, and the two are closely linked in their history both there and afterwards.

He was promised the Rectory of Llanvaches in 1610 by Edward Lewis, once it became vacant. It did so in the following year, but there was some impediment to it being granted. In 1613 he was instead granted the Rectory of Llanfihangel Roggiet, which he held until 1626. He was appointed Rector of Llanvaches in 1617 and then held both in plural. Even together, these were not a wealthy living and he maintained his connections with the Lewis family, acting as a family chaplain and as a property agent.

Until the 1620s Wroth was apparently "much addicted to mirth, levity, and music".  However, he became a changed man in 1625–1626 after one of his parishioners, who had won a legal case in London and had instructed his family to arrange a feast on his return with music provided by Wroth, died on the road home.  "Amidst the general consternation, Mr. Wroth cast away his violin, and falling on his knees in the midst of the company, most fervently prayed for the blessing of God upon this alarming providence." This conversion also led to him resigning the living of Llanvihangel in 1626, as the new Puritans disapproved of such pluralism.

He became, after John Parry, the earliest Puritan church leader in Wales and was a direct influence on fellow churchman, Walter Cradock. Cradock, the son of a neighbouring farmer, was also educated at Oxford and was to become curate of St.Mary's Church in Cardiff, where the vicar at the time was William Erbury.

In 1633, King Charles I, advised by the Archbishop of Canterbury, William Laud, reissued the "Declaration of Sports". This listed the sports that were permitted on Sundays and other holy days, and was published to counteract the growing Puritan calls for strict abstinence on the Sabbath day. Wroth, Cradock and Erbury all defied the instruction to read the Declaration to their congregations, and in 1634 the Bishop of Llandaff reported Wroth to the Court of High Commission, seeking to remove him from his position. The following year the Bishop admonished Erbury and suspended Cradock who may have been regarded as the ring-leader. Wroth's response was to have inscribed on the churchyard stile the words:Who Ever hear on SondayWill Practis Playing at BallIt May be before MondayThe Devil Will Have you All

In 1638 Erbury resigned, but Wroth conformed and continued at Llanvaches, preaching and gathering followers. Meanwhile, Cradock, who had become curate at Wrexham, was also now drawing great crowds with his preaching. The infuriated townsfolk of Wrexham, however, forced Cradock to leave and he moved on to Brampton Bryan in Herefordshire.

At Llanvaches, Wroth's preaching became so popular that people travelled from the counties of Somerset, Gloucester, Hereford, Radnor and Glamorgan to hear him. In fact Wroth had to preach in the churchyard because the church was too small to accommodate all those who attended. By 1639, although he had not formally left the Church of England, Wroth formed a 'gathered church' within the parish church at Llanvaches, whose members were bound together through a church covenant and were the only ones who received the sacraments, although they continued to worship with the unconverted in the parish church. Wroth is known to have preached at Broad Mead chapel in Bristol, with those of similar views. His 'gathered church' at Llanvaches was organised "according to the New England pattern" – that is, Congregational, following the example of John Cotton and other Puritan leaders in New England – and was constituted in November 1639 with the help of the fellow leading Dissenter, Henry Jessey. The historic meeting at Llanvaches in November 1639 marked the real beginning of Nonconformism in Wales.

Wroth died in early 1641, shortly before the outbreak of the first English Civil War, and was buried, in accordance with his wishes, beneath the porch at Llanvaches parish church, although no memorial survives. His will, at one time on display in the vestry of the church, read:
I leave my body to be buried where ye Lord shall please to call for mee praying him to bring my hoarie-head into the grave in his peace which passeth all understanding.

The current Tabernacle United Reformed Church Chapel was built in the 1920s. The original church stood in the neighbouring hamlet of Carrow Hill and was rebuilt in Llanvaches in 1802, when a suitable plot of land was found.

References

External links

United Tabernacle Reform Chapel
St. Dyfrig's Church
Free Church History at The Tin Type Shop: "Chapter XIII – The Awakening of Wales"
"The oldest Nonconformist Chapel in Wales" at Data-Wales.co.uk
History Of Tabor Congregational Church by Rev. E. B. Powell at Tabor Congregational Church (Maesycwmmer, Monmouthshire) Centenary, 1829–1929

1576 births
1642 deaths
Welsh theologians
16th-century Welsh theologians
17th-century Welsh theologians
Alumni of Jesus College, Oxford
17th-century Welsh Anglican priests
People from Abergavenny
Welsh Congregationalist ministers